William Leighton Carss, (February 15, 1865 – May 31, 1931) was a U.S. Representative from Minnesota; born in Pella, Marion County, Iowa and subsequently moved with his parents to Des Moines, Iowa, in 1867.  There he attended the public schools, studied civil and mechanical engineering and followed that profession for a number of years. He moved to St. Louis County, Minnesota in 1893 and settled in Proctor where he found work as a locomotive engineer and became a member of the Brotherhood of Locomotive Engineers.  Carss was elected as a Farmer-Labor candidate to the 66th congress (March 4, 1919 – March 3, 1921) from Minnesota's 8th congressional district.

Carss was fond of British literature, reciting selections from Shakespeare, Carlyle and Burns by heart. He sponsored pro-labor legislation during his first term, supporting old age pensions (anticipating the Social Security system), women's rights and (to the dismay of some of his supporters) the Prohibition Amendment.

Carss was an unsuccessful candidate for reelection as a Democrat in 1920 to the 67th congress and for election in 1922 to the 68th congress.  He was elected on the Farmer-Labor ticket to the 69th and 70th congresses (March 4, 1925 – March 3, 1929); but was defeated for reelection in 1928 to the 71st congress. Carss moved to Duluth in 1929 where he resumed his position as a locomotive engineer at Proctor. He was unsuccessful in his 1930 bid for election to the 72nd congress. He died in Duluth on May 31, 1931, and was interred in Oneota Cemetery.

References

External links
 
 William L. Carss: An Inventory of His Papers at the Minnesota Historical Society

Democratic Party members of the United States House of Representatives from Minnesota
1865 births
1931 deaths
Locomotive superintendents
American people in rail transportation
Minnesota Farmer–Laborites
Farmer–Labor Party members of the United States House of Representatives
People from Pella, Iowa
Brotherhood of Locomotive Engineers and Trainmen people